Telamoptilia cathedraea is a moth of the family Gracillariidae. It is known from India (Meghalaya, Bihar), Taiwan, Japan (Kyūshū, the Ryukyu Islands) and Madagascar.

The wingspan is 7–8 mm.

The larvae feed on Urena lobata and Urena tomentosa. They probably mine the leaves of their host plant.

References

Acrocercopinae
Moths of Madagascar
Moths of Asia
Moths of Japan
Moths of Africa
Moths described in 1908